The 2014-15 BCHL season was the 53rd season of the British Columbia Hockey League. (BCHL) The sixteen teams from the Interior, Island and Mainland divisions played 58 game schedules, starting with the 2014 BCHL Showcase in Chilliwack, BC from September 19 to 21, 2014.

In March, the top teams from each division played for the Fred Page Cup, the BCHL Championship, won by the Penticton Vees. Penticton moves on to compete in the Western Canadian Junior A championship, the Western Canada Cup in Fort McMurray, Alberta. If successful against the winners of the Alberta Junior Hockey League, Saskatchewan Junior Hockey League, Manitoba Junior Hockey League and the Western Canada Cup host, the champion and runner-up would then move on to play for the Canadian Junior Hockey League championship, the Royal Bank Cup, in Portage la Prairie, Manitoba.

Changes
In conjunction with CJHL rule changes, any player being assessed a fighting major in a game will also be assessed a game misconduct.

Standings
Note:  GP = Games Played, W = Wins, L = Losses, T = Ties, OTL = Overtime Losses, Pts = Points

Teams are listed on the official league website. 
Standings listed by eSportsDeskPro on the official league website.

2014-2015 BCHL Fred Page Cup Playoffs

Division Playoffs

Semi-final Round Robin
{| cellpadding="1" width="340px" style="font-size: 90%; border: 1px solid gray;"
|- 
! style="background: #eeeeee;" width="25" |Rank
! style="background: #eeeeee;" width="165" |Team
! style="background: #eeeeee;" width="60" |W-L
! style="background: #eeeeee;" width="30" |GF
! style="background: #eeeeee;" width="30" |GA
! style="background: #eeeeee;" width="30" |+/-
! style="background: #eeeeee;" width="30" |Points
|-
| 1 || Penticton || 3-1 || 13 || 8 || +5 || 6
|-
| 2 || Nanaimo || 2-1 || 10 || 7 || +3 || 4
|-
| 3 || Chilliwack || 0-3 || 8 || 16 || -8 || 0
|}
*Chilliwack was mathematically eliminated after the fifth game of the round robin. Therefore, the sixth game was not played.

Fred Page Cup Final

Playoff results are listed on the official league website.

2015 Western Canada Cup
The Fred Page Cup Champion will advance to the 2015 Western Canada Cup in Fort McMurray, Alberta where they will play for one of two spots in the 2015 Royal Bank Cup.

Scoring Leaders
GP = Games Played, G = Goals, A = Assists, P = Points, PIM = Penalties In Minutes

Leading Goaltenders
Note: GP = Games Played, Mins = Minutes Played, W = Wins, L = Losses, T = Ties, GA = Goals Against, SO = Shutouts, Sv% = Save Percentage, GAA = Goals Against Average. Regulation losses and overtime losses have been combined for total losses.

Award Winners
Brett Hull Trophy (Top Scorer): Corey Mackin (Coquitlam)
Best Defenceman: Andrew Farny (Salmon Arm)
Bruce Allison Memorial Trophy (Rookie of the Year): Brett Supinski (Coquitlam) 
Bob Fenton Trophy (Most Sportsmanlike): John Schiavo (Merritt)
Top Goaltender: Hunter Miska (Penticton) 
Wally Forslund Memorial Trophy (Best Goaltending Duo): Hunter Miska & Brendan Barry (Penticton)
Vern Dye Memorial Trophy (regular-season MVP): Corey Mackin (Coquitlam)
Joe Tennant Memorial Trophy (Coach of the Year): Jason Tatarnic (Chilliwack)
Ron Boileau Memorial Trophy (Best Regular Season Record): Penticton Vees
Fred Page Cup (League Champions): Penticton Vees

Players Selected in 2015 NHL Entry Draft
Rd7: 190 Marcus Vela San Jose Sharks (Langley Rivermen)

See also
2015 Royal Bank Cup
2014 in ice hockey
2015 in ice hockey

References

External links
Official Website of the British Columbia Hockey League
Official Website of the Canadian Junior Hockey League

BCHL
British Columbia Hockey League seasons